Karadeniz Ereğli Museum (also known as Ereğli Museum) is a museum in Ereğli ilçe (district) of Zonguldak Province , Turkey. The modifier Karadeniz ("Black Sea") is used to 
distinguish Ereğli in Zonguldak Province from another similar-named ilçes in Konya and Tekirdağ Provinces.

Location and history
The museum is in Orhanlar neighborhood of Ereğli at 

The museum is actually a 19th-century Ottoman mansion built by Karamahmutoğlu Halil Pasha, a notable of the city. It is a four-storey  house (including the ground floor). In past it was used as a women's college. In 1988 it was taken over by the Ministry of Culture. In 1998 after restoration, it was opened as a museum.

The exhibited items
The ground floor is the administrative office. In the first floor, Hellenistic , Roman and Byzantine artifacts like marble stelai, terracota amphorae and pots, column headings, glass containers, ornaments, metallic items illumination tools and figurines are exhibited. There are also coins from Lydian, Hellenistic, 
Roman, Byzantine, Sassanid, Umayyad, Abbasid, Artukids, Seljukid and Ottoman eras. In the second floor, ethnographic items such as clothes, Elpek textile (unique to Ereğli area), weapons, ornaments, 
smoking tools, beads, clocks, kitchen tools, hand written books and bascules are exhibited. The third floor designed as a typical Ereğli house. In the yard there are 
sarcophagi column headings and plinths, an epitaph and a mausoleum The total number of exhibited items is 5428.

References

Buildings and structures in Zonguldak Province
Ereğli (Zonguldak)
Museums in Turkey
1998 establishments in Turkey
Tourist attractions in Zonguldak Province
Museums established in 1998